Bobae Market, usually shortened to Bobae, is a well-known cheap clothing market, both retail and wholesale. The market area has two huge wholesale shopping areas, Bobae Market and Bobae Tower.

Bobae Market's site on Krung Kasem Road along Khlong Phadung Krung Kasem (Phadung Krung Kasem Canal) in Khlong Maha Nak Subdistrict, Pom Prap Sattru Phai District, is between the Yotse Bridge (Kasat Suek intersection) and Jaturapak Rangsarit Bridge (Saphan Khao intersection) in Si Yaek Maha Nak Subdistrict, Dusit District, with some parts overlaps Rong Mueang Subdistrict, Pathum Wan District.

The term bobae in Thai means 'noisy' or 'boisterous'. It's assumed that the name is derived from the word bong beng (บ้งเบ้ง), which describes the general condition of the market.

Bobae Market was founded c. 1927 by Thai-Chinese group who gathered to sell local products such as coconut water, tea, coffee, or various agricultural products. During World War II the focus changed to used clothing. At first, the clothes sold were those of persons who had died in the war.

The market is open from 06:00 to 18:00 daily, Then during the night other sellers arrive to sell until dawn. Especially during the night, this is a very bustling market. 

This market is accessible by BMTA's bus routes 37, 53, 556 with a total of six bus stops both sides of Krung Kasem Road, including Khlong Saen Saep boat service by Talad Bobae Pier (W03).

Nearby places

References

External links

Neighbourhoods of Bangkok
Pom Prap Sattru Phai district
Retail markets in Bangkok
Wholesale markets

1927 establishments in Siam